The common hatchetfish or river hatchetfish (Gasteropelecus sternicla) is a tropical fish belonging to the freshwater hatchetfish family (Gasteropelecidae). Originating in South America in the Peruvian and middle Amazon, the Guianas and Venezuela, it grows to about 2.5 inches (6.5 cm). The fish gets its name from its relatively large protruding belly which resembles a hatchet. Hatchetfish will often jump out of the water when alarmed, propelled by their large, winglike pectoral fins. They also jump to catch small aerial insects.

In the aquarium

The river hatchetfish is a schooling species best kept in groups of five or more that spends most of its time in the top-level of the water where it searches for food.  These fish are peaceful towards other fishes, but frequently bicker among themselves. Typical lifespan in captivity is around five years, but can live longer. They come from streams in a tropical climate and prefer water at pH 6–7, a water hardness of up to 15.0 dGH, and an ideal temperature range of (23-27 °C (73-81 °F) . As carnivores, they will readily eat many types of small annelid worms, insects, and crustaceans, and they will also eat standard flake foods. They have a reputation for being greedy fish.

Because of their natural tendency to jump when alarmed, they may jump out of aquarium tanks. To prevent this, the top must either be completely sealed, or the water level lowered so the edges of the tank extend further upwards than the fish are capable of jumping.  This is also less common with the addition of floating plants, to provide cover.  It is also advised to keep them in a planted aquarium.

See also
 List of freshwater aquarium fish species

References 
 
 

Gasteropelecidae
Fish described in 1758
Taxa named by Carl Linnaeus